The 1995 Kent State Golden Flashes football team was an American football team that represented Kent State University in the Mid-American Conference (MAC) during the 1995 NCAA Division I-A football season. In their second season under head coach Jim Corrigall, the Golden Flashes compiled a 1–9–1 record (0–7–1 against MAC opponents), finished in last place in the MAC, and were outscored by all opponents by a combined total of 390 to 128.

The team's statistical leaders included Astron Whatley with 978 rushing yards, Todd Goebbel with 792 passing yards, and Kantroy Walker with 328 receiving yards.

Schedule

References

Kent State
Kent State Golden Flashes football seasons
Kent State Golden Flashes football